David Brock (born 1962) is an American journalist and author.

David Brock or Dave Brock may also refer to:

 Dave Brock (born 1941), English musician
 D. Brock Hornby (born 1944), American federal judge
 Dave Brock (American football) (born 1967), American football coach
 David Brock (lacrosse) (born 1986), Canadian lacrosse player
 Dave Brock, a singer with Manzarek–Krieger

See also 
 David Brockhoff (1928–2011), Australian rugby player called Brock
 David Brock Smith (fl. 2017), Oregon state representative
 Dave Brockie (1963–2014), Canadian-American heavy metal musician